"The Haunted Mind" is a short story by Nathaniel Hawthorne. It was first published in The Token and Atlantic Souvenir, 1835. It was later included in Volume Two of Twice-Told Tales, a collection of short stories by Hawthorne published in 1837.

Plot summary
In "The Haunted Mind", Hawthorne described an intermediate space between sleeping and waking. The story begins with the character's sudden waking from midnight slumber 1.

Quotes
"In the depth of every heart, there is a tomb and a dungeon, though the lights, the music, and revelry above may cause us to forget their existence, and the buried ones, or prisoners whom they hide."
"She was your fondest Hope, but a delusive one."

References

Short stories by Nathaniel Hawthorne
1835 short stories